The  was a regional command of the Imperial Japanese Army (equivalent to a field army) responsible for the defense of the Kantō region and western Honshū, Shikoku and Kyūshū during the Pacific War. It was one of the regional commands in the Japanese home islands reporting to the General Defense Command.

History
It was essentially a home guard and garrison responsible for recruitment and civil defense.

The Western District Army existed concurrently with the Japanese 16th Area Army and the Japanese 15th Area Army, which were tasked with organizing the final defenses of Kyūshū and Shikoku against the expected American invasion of the Japanese home islands. The Western District Army assumed all administrative functions, whereas the individual area armies were operational combat commands.

The Western District Army remained active for several months after the surrender of Japan to help maintain public order until the arrival of the American occupation forces, and to oversee the final demobilization and dissolution of the Imperial Japanese Army.

Commanders

Commanding officer

Chief of Staff

See also
Armies of the Imperial Japanese Army

Further reading

External links

Field armies of Japan
Military units and formations established in 1937
Military units and formations disestablished in 1945